"Night Boat" is a 1981 album track by Duran Duran.

Night Boat may also refer to:

 Night Boats, 2012 drama film
 The Night Boat, 1920 musical
 The Night Boat (book), 1980 novel by Robert McCammon
 "Night Boat to Cairo", 1979 single by Madness
 Night Boat to Dublin, 1946 thriller film
 Night Boat to Tangier, 2019 novel by Kevin Barry